Tazeh Yab (also Romanized as Tāzeh Yāb; also known as Tāzeh Yāb-e Garkaz) is a village in Jeyransu Rural District, in the Central District of Maneh and Samalqan County, North Khorasan Province, Iran. At the 2006 census, its population was 827, in 171 families.

References 

Populated places in Maneh and Samalqan County